Priapella intermedia, the Isthmian priapella, is a species of freshwater fish within the family Poeciliidae. It is found in Mexico.

References

Wischnath, L., 1993. Atlas of livebearers of the world. T.F.H. Publications, Inc., United States of America. 336 p.

intermedia
Freshwater fish of Mexico
Taxa named by Jose Álvarez del Villar
Taxa named by Jorge Carranza
Fish described in 1948